Jackson Fourgeaud, known professionally as Jackson and His Computerband (earlier Jackson and His Computer Band), is a French IDM artist. He released his debut album Smash with Warp Records in 2005.

History 
Jackson Fourgeaud began making music at the age of 15. After his acid house debut on Pumpking records in 1996, Sound of Barclay records released the "Sense Juice" and "Gourmet" EPs under the name Jackson & His Computer Band. In 2003 his fourth single, album opener "Utopia", was released. "Utopia" and "Fast Life" feature vocals by his mother, Paula Moore (birdpaula), a folk and blues singer. Warp Records picked up on these tracks, released on French imprint Sound Of Barclay, and signed him.

"Utopia", from the album Smash, was used in the O2 ‘bubble’ ad campaign. "Minidoux" and "Hard Tits" from the album Smash were used in the Adult Swim "Super Violence Disclaimer" and "AcTN water Tanks"  bumpers respectively. "Pump", "More" and "Seal," tracks from the Glow album, were featured in Adult Swim bumps that aired during the summer of 2016.

Smash was recorded at home and in various Paris studios. Jackson's also responsible for some of the artwork, including the inside painting. As for guests, again, his mother sings on the track "Fast Life"; his four-year-old niece narrates the tale of a mad king on "Oh Boy", which Jackson wrote. 

He performed at European summer festivals in Nîmes (France), Zurich (Switzerland) and Dour Festival (Belgium). His second album Glow was released on Warp Records on 2 September 2013.

On Glow, featured artists include Natas Loves You, Planningtorock and Cosmobrown. It was mastered by Mike Marsh (at The Exchange) and mixed by the late Philippe Zdar at the Motorbass studio.

Select tracks on Glow have been remixed by the likes of The Bloody Beetroots, Boys Noize, Brodinski, Hudson Mohawke and more.

Discography

Albums
 Smash (2005)
 Glow  (2013)

EPs & Singles
1999: Sense Juice EP
1999: Gourmet EP
2003: Utopia EP
2005: Rock On
2013: G.I. Jane (Fill Me Up)
2014: Memory

Remixes

References

External links
Jackson and His Computer Band at the Warp Records website

Intelligent dance musicians
French electronic musicians
Living people
Year of birth missing (living people)
Warp (record label) artists